Holdfast Bay is  a bay in South Australia.

Holdfast Bay may also refer to.

City of Holdfast Bay, a local government area in South Australia
Holdfast Bay Handicap, a road race held in South Australia
Holdfast Bay railway line, a former rail service in South Australia

See also
Holdfast (disambiguation)